Ferenc Szécsi (11 July 1913 – 1 March 1974) was a Hungarian stage and film actor with one directing credit at the end of a long career. In 1916, at the age of three and credited as Szécsi Ferkó, he appeared in the film Elnémult harangok.

Selected filmography
 Jön az öcsém (1919)
 Lengyelvér (1920)
The Frozen Child (1921)
 Elnémult harangok (1922)
 Stars of Eger (1923)
 Christopher Columbus (1923)
 Az örök titok (1938)
 Tiszavirág (1939)
 Gyurkovics fiúk (1941)
 Green Years (1965)

References

Bibliography
 Cunningham, John. Hungarian Cinema: From Coffee House to Multiplex. Wallflower Press, 2004.

External links

1913 births
1974 deaths
People from Caraș-Severin County
Hungarian male film actors
Hungarian male silent film actors
Hungarian male stage actors
20th-century Hungarian male actors
1974 suicides
Suicides in Hungary